Combet may refer to:
 Combet v Commonwealth, Australian court case decided in 2005
 Greg Combet (born 1958), Australian politician
 Louis Combet (1927–2004), French scholar of Spanish language